Dodë Gjergji (born 16 January 1963) is a Kosovan prelate of the Catholic Church. Since 2006, he serves as  Apostolic Administrator of Prizern. In 2018, when the apostolic administration was elevated to the status of the diocese, he became the first diocesan bishop.

Dodë Gjergji was born in Stublla near Viti, SFR Yugoslavia. From 2000 to 2005 he was the Apostolic Administrator of Sapë in Albania. He was appointed the bishop of Sapë on 23 November 2005 and consecrated on 5 January 2006. On 12 December 2006 he was appointed the apostolic administrator of Prizren.

On 5 September 2018, Pope Francis elevated the apostolic administration as a new diocese and appointed Dode Gjergji as its first diocesan bishop.

Notes

References

External links 

 Catholic Hierarchy: Bishop Dodë Gjergji
 Catholic Hierarchy: Diocese of Sapë
 Catholic Hierarchy: Apostolic Administration of Prizren
 GCatholic.org: Apostolic Administration of Prizren

1963 births
Living people
Kosovo Albanians
Kosovan Roman Catholic bishops
Bishops appointed by Pope Benedict XVI
21st-century Roman Catholic bishops in Albania